Thibault Scotto di Porfirio (born 17 September 1978 in Toulon), known as Thibault Scotto, is a French former professional footballer who played as a defender or a midfielder.

External links
 Career summary by playerhistory.com

1978 births
Living people
French footballers
Ligue 1 players
Ligue 2 players
OGC Nice players
FC Martigues players
Amiens SC players
FC Istres players
AS Cannes players
Association football defenders